A rollback occurs on a launched roller coaster when the train is not launched fast enough to reach the top of the tower or hill. It will roll backwards down the tower, and will be stopped by brakes on the launch track. Any roller coaster on which it is possible for a rollback to occur will have these brakes. Intamin, a manufacturer of roller-coasters, refers to the "rollback" as a "short shot".

Most coasters contain at least one anti-rollback device to prevent a train from rolling backwards while ascending the main lift. This is typically with chain-driven lifts, not hydraulic launchers such as Kingda Ka.

Factors
Rollbacks are most common (though still quite rare) on the world's largest launched roller coasters like Kingda Ka at Six Flags Great Adventure along with somewhat smaller rides such as Stealth at Thorpe Park and launched roller coasters of the same type, such as Xcelerator at Knott's Berry Farm and Storm Runner at Hersheypark.

There are several factors that can cause a rollback, all of which are related to the train's speed:
 Unusual wind gusts could slow the train down enough to cause it to roll back.
 Cold weather increases friction in the wheels.
 A rollback will often occur during the first few test launches each day, as the launch motor has not been sufficiently warmed up by this point. Intentional rollbacks are sometimes conducted during testing.

While the general public may not realize that rollbacks usually are completely safe and that coasters are designed with them in mind, many coaster enthusiasts look forward to being in one. Being in a rollback essentially gives riders a ride and a half, as the train will be launched again after the rollback. On some rides, when a rollback occurs with people on board, the train will first be brought back to the station to give the guests the option of getting off; other roller coasters with dual-train dispatch systems disallow backwards returns to the station and the train will simply be launched a second time without the option to disembark.

Unusual circumstances
On extremely rare occasions, a single train may require more than two launches to clear the highest point of the track.

Very rarely, a train is launched with just enough speed to reach the track's highest point, resulting in the train getting stuck on the top. This results in neither a full ride nor a rollback. This happened three times on Top Thrill Dragster.  All three times, a ride mechanic had to take an elevator to the top, and give the train a small push so it could complete the ride.  It has also happened twice on Stealth at Thorpe Park, both during early morning tests. Maverick at Cedar Point tests roll backs every morning during testing.

Examples
In a video of a rollback on Stealth at Thorpe Park, the train is seen to reach slightly over halfway over the midpoint at the top. The train proceeded to roll back, due to an insufficiently powerful launch, combined with an uneven distribution of weight on the train in April 2006. Stealth also had a rollback in March 2008 due to strong winds.

References

External links
 Footage of a rollback on Kingda Ka
 Footage of Top Thrill Dragster stuck in 2005

Launched roller coasters
Roller coaster elements